is a fantasy role-playing video game in the Summon Night series for the Nintendo DS. It is developed by Flight-Plan and Think & Feel and is published by Namco Bandai in Japan on November 5, 2009.

The game begins in the world of Runeheim as a decade of peace between the empire of Delteana and the kingdom of Celestia is about to end. The player has the choice to play from the viewpoint of either Phara or Dylan, both of which are heirs to the throne of the opposing kingdoms and are childhood friends caught between the impending war.

Characters

Dylan is the son of Glocken Will Delteana of Delteana.

Phara is the daughter of Novice Won Celestia and princess of Celestia.

Noin is the son of Novice Won Celestia and prince of Celestia.

Novice is the king of Celestia, also the father of Noin and Phara, and at some point had taken Delteana's prince, Dylan, under his wing to settle disputes between the kingdoms of Delteana and Celestia.

Glocken is the king of Delteana, also the father of Dylan, and at some point had taken Celestia's prince, Noin, under his wing to settle disputes between the kingdoms of Delteana and Celestia.

References

External links
 Official website  

2009 video games
Bandai Namco games
Flight-Plan games
Japan-exclusive video games
Nintendo DS games
Nintendo DS-only games
Role-playing video games
Single-player video games
Summon Night
Video games developed in Japan
Video games featuring female protagonists